Hounsell is a surname. Notable people with the surname include:

 Alan Hounsell (born 1947), New Zealand cricketer
 Barbara Hounsell (born 1951), Canadian swimmer
 Colin Hounsell (born 1955), Australian footballer
 Elizabeth Hounsell (born 1950), British academic and carbohydrate chemist 
 Patrick Hounsell (born 1958), New Zealand cricketer
 William Hounsell (1820–1903), English cricketer

See also
 David A. Hounshell (born 1950), academic historian